The Luohandong Formation is an Early Cretaceous geologic formation of the Ordos Basin in Inner Mongolia, China. The formation was initially dated to the earliest Cretaceous; Valanginian to Barremian, but later dating established an Aptian to Albian age. Dinosaur remains are among the fossils that have been recovered from the formation. Pterosaur fossils have also been recovered from the formation.

Fossil content

Vertebrates 

 Ikechosaurus sunailinae
 Ordosipterus planignathus
 Otogopterus haoae
 Shantungosuchus hangjinensis
 Wuerhosaurus ordosensis
 Ordosemys leios
 Sinemys gamera
 Eotomistoma sp.
 Psittacosaurus sp.
 Sinamia sp.
 Iguanodontidae indet.
 Mammalia indet.
 Neosuchia indet.
 Psittacosauridae indet.
 Pterosauria indet.
 Sauropoda indet.
 Stegosauria indet.

Insects 
 Dataiphis coniferis
 Fuxiaeschna hsiufunia

See also 
 List of dinosaur-bearing rock formations
 List of pterosaur-bearing stratigraphic units

References

Bibliography

Further reading 
 Q. B. Lin. 1995. On Penaphis Lin, 1980 of Cretaceous (Callaphididae, Homoptera) and its coevolutionary relationships. Acta Palaeontologica Sinica 34:194-204
 Z.-M. Dong. 1994. The field activities of the Sino-Canadian Dinosaur Project in China, 1987–1990. Canadian Journal of Earth Sciences 30(10-11):1997-2001
 X.-C. Wu, D. B. Brinkman, and J.-C. Lu. 1994. A new species of Shantungosuchus from the Lower Cretaceous of Inner Mongolia (China), with comments on S. chuhsienensis Young, 1961 and the phylogenetic position of the genus. Journal of Vertebrate Paleontology 14(2):210-229

Geologic formations of China
Lower Cretaceous Series of Asia
Cretaceous China
Albian Stage
Aptian Stage
Sandstone formations
Fluvial deposits
Paleontology in Inner Mongolia